A Readout integrated circuit (ROIC) is an integrated circuit (IC) specifically used for reading detectors of a particular type. They are compatible with different types of detectors such as infrared and ultraviolet. The primary purpose for ROICs is to accumulate the photocurrent from each pixel and then transfer the resultant signal onto output taps for readout. Conventional ROIC technology stores the signal charge at each pixel and then routes the signal onto output taps for readout. This requires storing large signal charge at each pixel site and maintaining signal-to-noise ratio (or dynamic range) as the signal is read out and digitized.

A ROIC has high-speed analog outputs to transmit pixel data outside of the integrated circuit. If digital outputs are implemented, the IC is referred to as a Digital Readout Integrated Circuit (DROIC). 

A Digital readout integrated circuit (DROIC) is a class of ROIC that uses on-chip analog-to-digital conversion (ADC) to digitize the accumulated photocurrent in each pixel of the imaging array. DROICs are easier to integrate into a system compared to ROICs as the package size and complexity are reduced, they are less sensitive to noise and have higher bandwidth compared to analog outputs.  

A Digital pixel readout integrated circuit (DPROIC) is a ROIC that uses on-chip analog-to-digital conversion (ADC) within each pixel (or small group of pixels) to digitize the accumulated photocurrent within the imaging array. DPROICs have an even higher bandwidth than DROICs and can significantly increase the well capacity and dynamic range of the device.

References

 Digital Converters for Image Sensors, Kenton T. Veeder, SPIE Press, 2015. 
 A 25μm pitch LWIR focal plane array with pixel-level 15-bit ADC providing high well capacity and targeting 2mK NETD, Fabrice Guellec et al, Proceedings Volume 7660, Infrared Technology and Applications XXXVI, 2010.
 A high-resolution, compact and low-power ADC suitable for array implementation in standard CMOS, Christer Jansson, IEEE Transactions on circuits and systems - I: Fundamental theory and applications, Vol. 42, No. 11, November 1995.
 Digital Pixel Readout Integrated Circuit for High Dynamic Range Infrared Imaging Applications, Phase I SBIR, Technology report, NASA Jet Propulsion Laboratory, July 2018.
 Digital pixel readout integrated circuit architectures for LWIR, Shafique, A., Yaziki, M., Kayahan, H., Ceylan, O., Gurbuz, Y., Proceedings Volume 9451, Infrared Technology and Applications XLI; 94510V, 2015.

Integrated circuits
Detectors

 Digital-Pixel Focal Plane Array Technology, Schultz, K., et al, Lincoln Laboratory Journal, Vol. 20, No. 2, 2014.
Sensors, Space Probes and Wi-Fi Cybersecurity, Oh My!, Maxfield, Max., Electronic Engineering Journal, February, 2020.
Digital Pixel Infrared Imaging Boosts Camera Speed and Performance, Bannatyne, R., Vision Systems Design, June 2020.